Galeazzo Ghidoni or Gidoni (Cremona, late 16th century - early 17th century) was an Italian painter.

Biography
He was a pupil in Cremona of Antonio Campi. His first activity in Cremona is documented by 1583.<ref>[https://books.google.com/books?id=ENxGAQAAIAAJ Pittura a Cremona dal Romanico al Settecento] by Mina Gregori and Luisa Bandera Gregori (1900); Page 287.</ref> His San Giovanni Battista preaching to the crowds'' (1598) was once in the now destroyed church of San Mattia of Cremona. He was later active in Florence (Cloister of the Ognissanti) and Rome in the early 17th century. His two sons Giovanni Battista and Vicenzo Gidoni were painters in Florence.

References

Year of birth missing
Year of death missing
16th-century Italian painters
Italian male painters
17th-century Italian painters
Painters from Cremona